Adlai Wendell "Gus" Bono (August 29, 1894 – December 3, 1948) was a pitcher in Major League Baseball. He played one season for the Washington Senators.

References

External links

1894 births
1948 deaths
Major League Baseball pitchers
Washington Senators (1901–1960) players
Baseball players from Missouri